Jack the Tab/Tekno Acid Beat is an album of material by Psychic TV released under the guise of a various artists compilation album. The album is compiled from the releases Jack the Tab – Acid Tablets Volume One and Tekno Acid Beat.

Legacy 

Jack the Tab was described by The Guardian as "Britain's first acid house record".

Track listing
This list gives alias, then track name
All tracks composed by Dave Ball, Genesis P-Orridge and Richard Norris; except where indicated

CD
CD 1:
King Tubby: "Psyche Out" - 3:53
Pearl Necklace: "Rapid Bliss" - 4:07
Thee Loaded Angels: "Aquarius Rising" - 1:36
Wolves Of The Sun: "Last Night" - 1:07
Mistress Mix: "Blue Heart" (Genesis P-Orridge) - 5:54
Griselda: "Oxygen" - 3:46
Psychic TV: "Jump Thee Gun" - 8:29
Over Thee Brink: "Terminate" - 5:52
Vernon Castle: "Youth" - 1:31
Nobody Uninc: "Only Human" (Nobody Uninc - Genesis P-Orridge, Richard Norris, Scott "Nobody" Hosterman) - 6:15
Alligator Shear: "Balkan Red Alert" - 4:59
M.E.S.H.: "Meet Every Situation Head On" - 5:25
Psychic TV: "Your Body" - 9:14
Godstar: "Abstract Reality" - 3:45
CD 2:
Virginia featuring Mista Luv: "Blue Pyramid" (Gini Ball) - 5:21
Sugardog: "Groove To Get Down" (Jim Whelan, John Gosling) - 4:52
Mistress Mix: "Wicked" (Genesis P-Orridge) - 6:32
Psychic TV: "Scared To Live" - 4:52
DJ Doktor Megatrip & Mista Luv: "Liquid Eyeliner" - 5:57
Sickmob: "Sandoz Tabman" (Fred Giannelli) - 5:25
Psychic TV: "Tune In (Turn On The Acid House)" - 5:33
DJ Doktor Megatrip with Luv Bass: "Joy" - 5:22
DJ Doktor Megatrip: "Discomen" - 9:30
Psychic TV: "Tune In" (Greedy Beat Syndicate remix) - 4:32
Psychic TV: "Love-War-Riot" (Vocoder mix) - 6:56
DJ Doktor Megatrip: "Neuropolitiks" - 2:31

2X12" vinyl
Side A:
King Tubby: "Psyche Out"
Pearl Necklace: "Rapid Bliss"
Thee Loaded Angels: "Aquarius Rising"
Wolves Of The Sun: "Last Night"
Mistress Mix: "Blue Heart"
Griselda: "Oxygen"
Side B:
Psychic TV: "Jump Thee Gun"
Over Thee Brink: "Terminate"
Vernon Castle: "Youth"
Nobody Uninc: "Only Human"
Alligator Shear: "Balkan Red Alert"
M.E.S.H.: "Meet Every Situation Head On"
Side C:
Virginia: "Blue Pyramid"
Sugardog: "Groove To Get Down"
Mistress Mix: "Wicked"
Psychic TV: "Scared To Live"
Side D:
DJ Doktor Megatrip & Mista Luv: "Liquid Eyeliner"
Sickmob: "Sandoz Tabman"
Psychic TV: "Tune In (Turn On Thee Acid House)"
DJ Doktor Megatrip with Luv Bass: "Joy"

References 

Psychic TV albums
1998 compilation albums